Zhutang Township is a township in Lancang Lahu Autonomous County, Yunnan, China.

Administrative division
As of 2016, the township is divided into elven villages: 
Munai 
Panzhihua 
Dongzhu 
Yunshan 
Laotanshan 
Datangzi 
Zhanmapo 
Nanben 
Cizhuhe 
Ganhe 
Junmeng

History
In 1940, Zhutang District was set up.

After the founding of the Communist State, in 1950, it became the seat of the county government.  During the Great Leap Forward, its name was changed to "Qianjin Commune" in 1969 and then "Zhutang Commune" in 1972. It was incorporated as a township in 1988.

Geography
It lies at the northern of Lancang Lahu Autonomous County, bordering Ximeng Va Autonomous County to the west, Menglang Town and Laba Township to the south, Fubang Township and Mujia Township to the north, and Nanling Township to the east.

The Nanlang River flows through the township northwest to southwest.

Economy
The township's economy is based on nearby mineral resources and agricultural resources. The main crops of the region are grain, followed by corn and wheat. Economic crops are mainly tea, tobacco, and castanea mollissima. The region abounds with lead, zinc and limestone.

Demographics

As of 2017, the National Bureau of Statistics of China estimates the township's population now to be 32,455.

Transportation
The National Highway G214 passes across the township.

Tourist attractions
The Datangzi Karst Cave is a well known tourist spot.

References

Bibliography

Townships of Pu'er City
Divisions of Lancang Lahu Autonomous County